Ark Clothing was part of Ark Fashion Limited which was subsidiary of JD Sports PLC - consisting of five stores, 
and an e-commerce store based in the United Kingdom.

They were official stockists to a number of branded fashion labels. The men's range included own label CLOAK, plus Superdry, Carhartt, Franklin & Marshall, Fred Perry, Original Penguin and Pretty Green; the women's range included Motel, Fred Perry, Mink Pink, The Ragged Priest and own label, Hearts & Bows.

History
ARK opened its first store in The Corn Exchange in Leeds in 1992. The shop was originally used to sell tickets to the ARK club nights but quickly branched into streetwear.  The store was an immediate success and grew quickly in size. The brand grew to have five brick and mortar stores, with many plans to expand across the UK plus an e-commerce store.

Closing
In January 2016, JD Sports PLC announced it planned to close all Ark Clothing stores. Ark Clothing announced this on their Instagram page and shortly after a closing down sale was launched. By the end of April 2016, all Ark stores were closed and their website shut down.

References

JD Sports buys retailer Ark out of administration - Telegraph
Ark Clothing Launch New Website
RETT Retail, Companies House

External links

Closeout Products

Clothing retailers of the United Kingdom
Online retailers of the United Kingdom